Nicaragua competed at the 2004 Summer Paralympics in Athens, Greece. The country's delegation consisted of a single competitor, Mario Madriz. Madriz competed in two track and field athletics events and did not win any medals.

Athletics

See also 
 Nicaragua at the 2004 Summer Olympics

References

Nations at the 2004 Summer Paralympics
2004
Paralympics